Thomas Dewar "Harry" Weldon   (5 December 1896 – 13 May 1958) was a British philosopher.

Life
Thomas Weldon was born at 3 Bryanston Mansions, York Street, Marylebone, London, in 1896. After an education at Tonbridge School, he won a scholarship to read Literae humaniores at Magdalen College, Oxford, which he postponed to become an officer in the Royal Field Artillery in 1915. He spent World War I in France and Belgium, rising to acting captain, being wounded and winning the Military Cross and bar. He finally went up to Oxford in 1919, graduating with a first class degree in 1921. Weldon was elected a fellow and philosophy tutor at his college two years later, getting to know C. S. Lewis. He then served as Rhodes travelling fellow in 1930.

During World War II, he was a temporary civil servant in London from 1939 to 1942, then Personal Staff Officer to "Bomber Harris" in RAF Bomber Command at High Wycombe from 1942 to 1945. His final duties there involved justifying Harris's controversial bombing strategy to politicians and the public.

His death in 1958 was attributed by college rumour to suicide but was in fact due to a cerebral haemorrhage.

Characterization of teaching style
In a review in the London Review of Books of a newly published work by Niall Ferguson, R. W. Johnson said that it amounted to a tutorial:  "The idea is to teach the young to think and argue, and the real past masters at it (Harry Weldon was always held up as an example to me) were those who first argued undergraduates out of their received opinions, then turned around after a time and argued them out of their new-found radicalism, leaving them mystified as to what they believed and suspended in a free-floating state of cleverness."

Works
Introduction to Kant's Critique of Pure Reason (1945; 2nd ed., 1958)
States and Morals (1946)
The Vocabulary of Politics (1953)

References

R.W. Johnson, Look Back in Laughter: Oxford's Postwar Golden Age (2015) has extensive biographical material on Harry Weldon.

External links
Times Higher Education

1896 births
1958 deaths
People educated at Tonbridge School
Alumni of Magdalen College, Oxford
Fellows of Magdalen College, Oxford
Royal Air Force personnel of World War II
Royal Artillery officers
British Army personnel of World War I
People from Marylebone
Recipients of the Military Cross
20th-century English philosophers
Royal Air Force officers